Personal Clothing System is the name of the current combat uniform of the British Armed Forces. This comes in Multi-Terrain Pattern camouflage and gradually replaced the CS95/DPM uniform.

Royal Navy Personal Clothing System (RNPCS)
The PCS No. 4 uniform worn by the Royal Navy, in plain navy blue, was unveiled in March 2015.

See also

 Combat uniform
 Disruptive Pattern Material

References

Camouflage patterns
British military uniforms
Military camouflage